The National Theatre was built on the slope of Fort Canning Park along River Valley Road in the Museum Planning Area of Singapore. The theatre was officially opened on 8 August 1963 to commemorate Singapore's self-governance and was the first and largest national theatre in Singapore back then. It was once the venue for various international performances, universities' convocations and the National Day rallies until it was demolished in August 1986 due to structural reasons and to make way for the nearby construction part of Central Expressway along Clemenceau Avenue.

History
Prior to the National Theatre's establishment, the western slope of Fort Canning Hill (known as King George V Jubilee Park) was relatively bare as the only occupant being the Van Kleef Aquarium.

The establishment of the Ministry of Culture, as it notes, Mr. Lee gathered the various cultural groups in Singapore to stage a series of concerts (Aneka Ragam Ra’ayat) wherein cross-viewing of others’ ethnic performances was advocated. The success of these concerts sparked the idea of a National Theatre thus in that same year, the building was commissioned.

Costing S$2.2 million to build, the theatre was designed by local architect Alfred Wong in 1963 after his firm won a design competition to build the first national theatre. It had 3,420 seats and was built with funds jointly donated by the Singapore government and the public through "a-dollar-a-brick" campaign with song requests made on radio. On 14 May 1964, The then Minister for Culture, S Rajaratnam, formally received the keys of the theatre from the company which carried out the construction said: "The theatre provides a good example of how the success of any effort depends ultimately on the co-operation and dedication of people from all walks of life."

Post-independence 
After the separation with Malaysia, it was thought that it is necessary to galvanise the people of Singapore to view themselves as citizens of a new and independent nation. It is important to leverage on the common experiences of the people to engineer a shared identity. The urban resettlement programme, National Service, and the arts were therefore envisaged to be the pillars of 'nationalism'.

However, slowly, there emerged a general sense that Singapore society was highly industrial, albeit lacking in refinement, as commented by Mr. Rajaratnam: "Music, painting, drama, literature and a concern for beauty generally are what transforms a prosperous society into a civilized society." Moreover, there was also the problem of “unhealthy, yellow culture” as per 'West' influenced. As a result, arts is used to shape the citizenry into a more “cultured” image, and several initiatives were launched by the National Theatre Trust (NTT).  For instance, it later proposed to promote professional shows “like the Georgia State Ballet, the Bolshoi Ballet”.

Architecture
AWP Pte Ltd were the Architects of the building. The most significant feature of the National Theatre was its huge 150-tonne cantilevered steel roof which stretched to the slopes of Fort Canning; a five-pointed facade which represented the five stars of the Singapore flag in the same way as its outdoor fountain was supposed to represent the crescent moon. The theatre had no side or rear walls and only the huge roof shielded the audience from the elements. It also had a revolving stage which was rarely used and cost S$10,000 annually to maintain.

Notable events

Many important performances were staged at the National Theatre from 1966 to 1982, the annual National Day Rally was held at the theatre too. Its first show, the Southeast Asian Cultural Festival, was attended by 11 Asian countries such as princesses from Cambodia, glamorous film stars from Hong Kong and folk dancers from all neighbouring countries. These performers were taking part for the first time in which the First President of Singapore, Encik Yusof bin Ishak described the event as a "South-East Asian cultural renaissance".

In the 1960s and early 1970s, many world-famous and legendary personalities that have performed at the theatre, included the following:
 The Russian Bolshoi Ballet
 The Sadler's Wells Ballet
 The Louis Armstrong Jazz Band
 The Duke Ellington Orchestra
 Woody Herman & his Orchestra
 Johnny Mathis
 Shirley Bassey
 The Bee Gees
 The Hollies
 The Walker Brothers
 The Yardbirds
 Herman's Hermits
 The Shadows

The University of Singapore used to hold their annual convocations at the National Theatre until the early 1980s. The then future Prime Minister of Singapore, Goh Chok Tong attended his convocation at the theatre on 6 June 1964. Other notable events such as the Miss Singapore and Mr Universe were regularly held at the National Theatre too.

Closure and demolition

In the early 1980s, the theatre was labelled structurally unsafe due to defects discovered in its cantilever roof. Also, with the proximity of the proposed Central Expressway tunnel to the theatre coupled with its declining use due to the lack of air-conditioning, led to a government decision to demolish the National Theatre.

Without any ceremony or fanfare, the National Theatre boarded up its doors and pulled down the curtains on an eventful era for local theatre. Its last performance was held on 15 January 1984. After the National Theatre Trust moved to the smaller Kallang Theatre in March 1986, demolition works took place between June to August 1986, just as the Kallang Theatre opened to its first performance in June of that year.

Its former site has been marked as a Heritage Site by the National Heritage Board for "signifying a spirit of self help and nationhood in the early days of nation building". The two historical markers have since been removed to make way for the Fort Canning MRT station which was opened in 21 October 2017.

See also

Fort Canning Lighthouse
Old National Library Building
National Monuments of Singapore

References

Notes

Works cited

External links
Picture gallery of the National Theatre

Demolished buildings and structures in Singapore
Theatres in Singapore
Theatres completed in 1963
Museum Planning Area
1963 establishments in Singapore
20th-century architecture in Singapore